Tim Etchells (born 1962) is an English artist and writer based in Sheffield and London. Etchells is the artistic director of Forced Entertainment, an experimental performance company founded in 1984. He has published several works of fiction, written about contemporary performance and exhibited his visual art projects in various locations. Etchells' work spans performance, video, photography, text projects, installation and fiction. He is currently Professor of Performance and Writing at Lancaster University

Biography

Etchells is currently Professor of Performance at Lancaster University and has been teaching extensively in a variety of contexts. In 2006, he convened The Presence Project, a series of workshops at Stanford University.

Etchells' publication, Vacuum Days, based on his year-long web-based project of 2011, was published by Storythings in 2012. Etchells has published several works of fiction, Endland Stories, The Dream Dictionary for the Modern Dreamer and the novel The Broken World and has written about contemporary performance in The Guardian and in artist monographs, such as an MIT Press publication on the work of Tehching Hsieh and a Live Art Development Agency publication on Ron Athey.

In 2013 he was guest curator of Ljubljana's Exodos Festival – selecting an international programme of work in performance, theatre and dance. On 25 November 2013, Etchells gave a public keynote address Live Forever, at Tate Modern in the frame of their research series Collecting the Performative A new public sculpture work by Etchells, A Stitch in Time was commissioned for the Lumiere Festival, Londonderry, and installed on top of the old Rosemount Shirt Factory. The work comprises a 23 metre long and 2 metre high sign made with white LED bulbs.

In 2014 Etchells was invited to be part of Lisbon biennial Artist in the City program.

In 2019, And Other Stories will publish Endland, a collection of short stories by Etchells.

Collaborations
Etchells regularly collaborates with artists, including photographer Hugo Glendinning, with whom he worked on the 1999 exhibition Void Spaces and the ongoing series Empty Stages. Empty Stages has been exhibited widely, including as part of Etchells' solo show at Jakopic Gallery in Ljubljana in 2013.

Other collaborations include writing essays for performance artist Franko B's Still Lives publication, for the visual art duo Elmgreen and Dragset's project Drama Queens and working with the pair on their later project Happy Days in the Art World. An Art in America article on Happy Days in the Art World said "Etchells is an experimental British playwright of some fame whose work is Beckettian, not Beckett-esque. His work is mocking and meandering but can really get under the skin, and prick at latent feelings of abjection, loneliness, the inability to communicate, futility."

Etchells collaborated with interactive performance maker Ant Hampton on two projects Lest We See (2013) and The Quiet Volume (2010) which has been produced in English, German, Spanish, Slovenian, Japanese, Polish, Dutch and Portuguese. The Quiet Volume won a 2013 Bessie Dance and Performance Award for Outstanding Sound Design following presentations by Performance Space 122 and PEN World Voices Festival. The citation for the award ran as follows: "For their use of intimately whispered text in a work in libraries across the city and for a score which heightened the experience in a space at once public and private".

Awards and honours
2006: Honorary doctorate by Dartington College of Arts, in recognition of his writing for and about contemporary performance.
2008–2013: Etchells was the recipient of The Legacy: Thinker In Residence Award, a joint initiative by the Live Art Development Agency and Tate Research. Within the framework of this award, he produced a new publication, While You Are With Us Here Tonight (2013).

Bibliography
Endland Stories. 1999. Pulp Books
Certain Fragments. Routledge, 1999.
The Dream Dictionary for the Modern Dreamer. Duckworth Overlook, 2004.
The Broken World. Heinemann, 2008.
Vacuum Days. Storythings, 2012.
While You are With Us Here Tonight, Live Art Development Agency; Tate Research, 2013.
Endland. And Other Stories, 2019 (upcoming).

Forced Entertainment performances directed by Etchells

Solo visual art exhibitions
 100 People and 3 People, The Gallery at Sketch, London, 2007
 Tim Etchells, Gasworks, London, UK, 2010
 Fog Game, Künstlerhaus Bremen, 2010
 From Afar, Bunkier Sztuki, Kraków, 2011
 Shouting Your Demands, Curtain Road, October 2013. Curated by Make-Room in collaboration with Duggan Morris Architects
 What is, and What is Possible, Jakopič Gallery, Ljubljana, Slovenia, 2013
A Stitch in Time, old Rosemount Shirt Factory, Londonderry, part of Lumiere Festival, 28 November – 1 December 2013, during Derry-Londonderry City of Culture 2013.

Video works with Hugo Glendinning
 Starfucker, Down Time.
 Kent Beeson is a Classic & an Absolutely New Thing.

References

External links
 
 Forced Entertainment
 Stanford University Presence Project
 Guardian Review of Exquisite Pain
 Guardian Review of Bloody Mess

Living people
1962 births
Theatre practitioners
English contemporary artists